The Angolan Women's Basketball League, (in Portuguese) Campeonato Nacional de Basquetebol em Séniores Femininos, is the top tier women’s basketball league in Angola. The competition is organized by the Angolan Basketball Federation.

Primeiro de Agosto has been the most successful club in Angola with a total 12 titles won, followed by Interclube, with 4.

History

League seasons and finals

MVP award winners and statistical leaders

Total league championships

Participation details

See also
 Angola Cup
 Angola Super Cup
 Federação Angolana de Basquetebol

External links
Official Website 
Eurobasket.com League Page

References

Basketball leagues in Angola
Women's basketball leagues in Africa
1977 establishments in Angola
Sports leagues established in 1977
lea